The Kirengellids are a group of problematic Cambrian fossil shells of marine organisms. The shells bear a number of paired muscle scars on the inner surface of the valve.

These fossils have conventionally been regarded as monoplacophoran molluscs, and possibly ancestral to gastropods or cephalopods.  They were presumed to be exogastric on the presumption that their larger muscle scars were anterior, but it may be dangerous to compare these scars with molluscan musculature.  In any case, they coiled in the opposite direction to Romaniella.  However, their calcitic shells, the position of the muscle scars, and putative association with secondary shell elements, make a brachiopod affinity possible, by analogy with the mobergellans: a group of phosphatic shells from the same time period, with a similar set of muscle scars. There is also strong similarity to the contemporary brachiopod group, the Craniopsids. In the case of this diagnosis, a simple lophophore apparatus is postulated to sit between the muscle scars and the edges of the shell.

Included taxa

After 
 Kirengella Rozov, 1968 (Upper Cambrian)
 † Kirengella alta Whitfield 1889 
 Kirengella ayaktchica - type species
 Kirengella expansus
 † Kirengella kultavasaensis Doguzhaeva 1972 
 Kirengella oregonensis
 Kirengella pyramidalis
 † Kirengella rectilateralis Berkey 1898 
 † Kirengella stabilis Berkey 1898 
 Kirengella washingtonense
 Hypseloconus (Upper Cambrian)
 Lenaella (Tremadoc / Lower Ordovician)
 Nyuella (Tremadoc / Lower Ordovician)
 Romaniella (Arenig / late Lower Ordovician)
 Moyerokania (Arenig / late Lower Ordovician)
 Angarella (Arenig / late Lower Ordovician)
 Pygmaeoconus (Llanvirn / early Middle Ordovician)

References

 S. N. Rozov. 1975. A new order of the Monoplacophora. Paleontological Journal 15(1):39-43
 G.P. Wahlman. 1992. Middle and Upper Ordovician symmetrical univalved mollusks (Monoplacophora and Bellerophontina) of the Cincinnati Arch region. United States Geological Survey Professional Paper 1066(O):1-123

Cambrian animals